
The following lists events that happened during 1813 in South Africa.

Events
 Adam Kok III's people assert the name Griqua
 Court proceedings are now opened to the public in the Cape Colony
 A Dutch Reformed Church is established in George
 2 November - Lord Charles Henry Somerset is appointed Governor of the Cape

Births
 19 March - David Livingstone, explorer and missionary, is born in Blantyre, South Lanarkshire, Scotland
 1 May 1813 - João Albasini, an Italian trader, Bantu commissioner and the white chief of the Magwamba tribe, is born in Portugal

References
See Years in South Africa for list of References

Years in South Africa